George Clarke (29 June 1823 – 10 March 1913) was an Australian-born New Zealand pioneer and educationist.

Early life
George Clarke was born in Parramatta, New South Wales, the son of the Revd George Clarke, an early missionary to New Zealand with the Church Missionary Society. Clarke senior who came from Norfolk and arrived at Hobart, Van Diemen's Land in September 1822. Clarke senior then went to Sydney, and while waiting for a ship to New Zealand, took charge of an establishment of Aborigines near Parramatta. 

The family went on to New Zealand in 1824 and settled at Bay of Islands. His father worked at the Waimate mission, teaching the Māori students.

In 1832 George Clarke the younger was sent to Hobart and went to R. W. Giblin's school. Returning to New Zealand early in 1837 the boy studied with the Rev. William Williams, afterwards Bishop of Waiapu. In 1839 he went with Williams to Poverty Bay, still continuing his studies, and there obtained an excellent knowledge of the Māori language, and of the mentality of the Maoris; an invaluable experience that he found of great use a year or two later.

Career
In 1840 Clarke's father was made protector of aborigines by the recently appointed lieutenant-governor, Captain Hobson. The seat of government was transferred to Auckland, and there the elder Clarke bought a large block of land from the Maoris for the government. In January 1841 his son was appointed a clerk in the native department of the civil service of New Zealand. In February 1842 he was translator at the trial of Wiremu Kingi Maketu, who was the first Māori condemned to death for murder. Clarke had already formed the ambition of becoming a clergyman, but for five years he remained in the government employ, first as an interpreter, then as a Maori advocate and protector, and eventually as a negotiator with the Māori . In all these capacities he did most valuable work. 

Clarke accompanied Commissioner William Spain as an interpreter, during his inquiry into the claims of the New Zealand Company, and was fiercely assailed by the representatives of the company. Eventually the claims of the company were reduced. New Plymouth and Manawatu were shown to have been purchased correctly but in most other cases the New Zealand Company had to pay further sums to Māori as compensation. In June 1844 Clarke was sent to Otago to assist in the purchase of a large block of land for the projected Scottish settlement. Clarke had to fight hard to preserve the Māori pā, village cultivations and burial grounds, but eventually succeeded, and the sale of something over 400,000 acres (1,600 km²) of what is now the province of Otago was concluded. Clarke wrote out the original Māori deed and English translation, and took pride in the fact that no dispute ever arose subsequently in regard to the transaction. For eight of the early months of 1845 Clarke was in the centre of the war with the Māori, and for most of the time was the only representative of the government in the district. On 18 November 1845 Governor Grey arrived and Clarke was at once attached to his personal staff. Grey was anxious to put an end to the war and eventually peace was declared. Clarke said of this conflict "Heke's war stands quite alone in the history of our struggles with the Maori race; alone in its magnanimity, its chivalry, its courtesy, and, I dare say, its control by Christian sentiment". In another place he mentions that "Heke always said, if fight we must, let us fight like gentlemen". But though Clarke could pay these well-deserved tributes in his account of the great chief, he could say little about his own conduct as representative of the government, which was equally creditable. In 1846, greatly to the regret of Grey, Clarke resigned from the government service. Grey pointed out to him that he had splendid prospects if he would remain, but his health had suffered, he still retained his ambition to be a minister of the Gospel, and, moreover, he could not reconcile his conscience with some of the acts of the government.

Minister
Clarke left New Zealand for Hobart and early in 1847 sailed to London and entered at Highbury College. He was ordained in the Union Chapel, Islington in 1851, and at once returned to Hobart to become minister of the Collins Street church. Soon a larger church was built in Davey Street, and for over 50 years he remained its pastor, honoured and beloved by all and never losing his appeal to the younger people. He took much interest in higher education, and was a member of the Tasmanian Council of Education for many years from 1878 and its president 1880–81. He was also a member of the Royal Society of Tasmania and a promoter of the Hobart Debating and Literary Association. He was one of the founders of the University of Tasmania, its first vice-chancellor from May 1890 to May 1898, and chancellor from May 1898 to May 1907, when he retired. He had retired from his church work in 1904. He died at Hobart on 10 March 1913. Apart from his Notes on Early Life in New Zealand, which appeared in 1903, Clarke's only publications were some separately published sermons and addresses and a small collection of Short Liturgies for Congregational Worship. He also wrote the memoir of James Backhouse Walker prefixed to his Early Tasmania. Clarke married a daughter of Henry Hopkins and was survived by two sons and four daughters.

Notes

References
Sally O'Neill, 'Clarke, George (1823–1913)', Australian Dictionary of Biography, Volume 3, MUP, 1969, pp 411–412.
Notes on Early Life in New Zealand, by George Clarke. Not working 2012-02-29
Frank Sainsbury, 'Notes on Early Life in New Zealand, by George Clarke.' Retrieved 2012-02-29

1823 births
1913 deaths
New Zealand educators
People from New South Wales
Settlers of New Zealand
Australian emigrants to New Zealand